Iria: Zeiram the Animation is a six-part anime series with starring its eponymous protagonist, Iria.

Iria or IRIA may also refer to:
 Saint Iria, (c.635–653), Portuguese saint
 Iria (river) or Staffora, a river in north-west Italy
 Voghera or Iria, a town of in Lombardy
 , a town within the municipality of Loures, Portugal
 Islamic Republic of Iran Army
 Institut de recherche en informatique et en automatique, a French computer science research institute
 Iria, from Albanian mythology

See also 
 Iria Sylvestoli, a character in Star Ocean
 Cova da Iria, in Fátima, Portugal
 Iria Flavia, the former bishopric in Galicia (Spain)
 Irene (disambiguation)
 Iris (given name)
 Ira (name)

Portuguese feminine given names